Gerard Houckgeest (c. 1600–August 1661) was a Dutch Golden Age painter of architectural scenes and church interiors.

Biography
Houckgeest is thought to have been born in The Hague, where, according to the RKD, he learned to paint from Bartholomeus van Bassen and worked in The Hague (1625–1635), Delft (1635–1649), Steenbergen (1651–52) and Bergen op Zoom (1652–1669). Some believe he spent some time in England as well. He specialized in painting imaginary church interiors and renaissance buildings, and died in Bergen op Zoom.
Some of his works now reside at the Mauritshuis.

References

External links
Works at WGA
Works and literature on Gerard Houckgeest
Vermeer and The Delft School, a full text exhibition catalog from The Metropolitan Museum of Art, which contains material on Gerard Houckgeest

1600s births
1661 deaths
Dutch Golden Age painters
Dutch male painters
Artists from The Hague